The surname Ewing is of Scottish origin, and is an Anglicised form derived from the Gaelic clan name "Clann Eóghain" meaning "Children of Eóghain". The forename "Eógan" is thought to derive ultimately from the Greek eugenes (Greek- ευγενής, meaning "noble", literally "well-born").

The earliest known coat of arms in the name Ewing appears in the Workman Armorial dated 1566.

Notable people with the surname

Born before 1800
 Alexander Ewing (soldier) (1768–1827), soldier for the Continental Army during the American Revolutionary War and the War of 1812
 Finis Ewing (1773–1841)
 John Ewing (pastor) (1732–1801), American Presbyterian pastor and university president
 John Ewing (1789–1858), U.S. Representative from Indiana
 John Hoge Ewing (1796–1887), U.S. Representative from Pennsylvania
 Thomas Ewing (1789–1871), U.S. politician
 William Lee D. Ewing (1795–1846), U.S. politician

Born before 1900
 A.C. Ewing (1889–1973), British philosopher
 Alexander Ewing (bishop) (1814–1873), Scottish church leader
 Alexander Ewing (composer) (1830–1895), Scottish composer
Alfred Ewing (1855–1935), British physicist and engineer
 Andrew Ewing (1813–1864), American politician
 Arthur Henry Ewing (1864–1912), American Presbyterian missionary and academic
 Bob Ewing (1873–1947), American baseball player
 Charles Lindsay Orr-Ewing (1860–1903), Scottish politician
 Clinton L. Ewing (1879–1953), American farmer, businessman, and politician
 Dave Ewing (1881–1952), English footballer
 Edwin Hickman Ewing (1809–1902), American politician
 Emma Pike Ewing (1838–1917), American educator, author
 George Clinton Ewing (1810–1888), American politician and founder of Holyoke, Massachusetts
 George Edwin Ewing (1828–1884), Scottish sculptor
 Henry Ellsworth Ewing (1883–1951), American arachnologist
 J. C. Ewing (1875–1965), American college sports coach
 James Ewing (1866–1943), American pathologist
 John Ewing (1863–1895), American baseball player
 John D. Ewing (1892–1952), Louisiana journalist; editor, publisher of Shreveport Times, Monroe New-Star-World
 Juliana Horatia Ewing (1842–1885), English children's writer
 Matthew Ewing (1815–1874), American inventor
 Norman Ewing (1870–1928), Australian politician
 Norman Orr-Ewing (1880–1960)
 Robert Ewing (mayor) (1849–1932), mayor of Nashville, Tennessee, 1915–1917
 Buck Ewing (1859–1906), American Major League Baseball player
 Sir Archibald Orr-Ewing, 1st Baronet (1818–1893), Scottish politician
 Thomas Ewing (1856–1920), Australian politician
 Thomas Ewing Jr. (1829–1896), American lawyer, general, and politician

Born before 1950
 Diana Ewing (born 1946), American television actress
 Harry Ewing, Baron Ewing of Kirkford (1931–2007), British politician
 Ian Orr-Ewing (1912–1999), British politician
 James Arthur Ewing (born 1916), 40th Governor of American Samoa
 James Eugene Ewing (born 1933), American evangelist
 John H. Ewing (1918–2012), member of the New Jersey General Assembly and State Senate
 Margaret Ewing (1945–2006), Scottish politician, wife of Fergus Ewing
 Maurice Ewing (1906–1974), American geophysicist and oceanographer
 Roger Ewing (born 1942), American film and television actor
 Rufus Ewing (born 1942), politician in the Turks and Caicos Islands
 Streamline Ewing, born John Ewing (1917–2002), American jazz trombonist
 Thomas W. Ewing (born 1935), American politician
 Winnie Ewing (born 1929), Scottish politician

Born after 1950
 Al Ewing (born 1977), British comic writer
 Annabelle Ewing (born 1960), Scottish politician, daughter of Winnie Ewing
 Daniel Ewing (born 1983), American professional basketball player
 Dan Ewing (born 1985), Australian actor
 Fergus Ewing (born 1957), Scottish politician, son of Winnie Ewing
 Fyfe Ewing (born 1970), Irish drummer
 Garen Ewing (born 1969), British comic creator
 Gavin Ewing (born 1981), Zimbabwean cricketer
 Larry Ewing, American computer programmer
 Lynne Ewing, American author and a screenwriter
 Marc Ewing (born 1969), American developer of the Red Hat brand of software
 Maria Ewing (1950–2022), American opera singer
 Mason Ewing (born 1982), Cameroonian producer, director, scriptwriter and fashion designer
 Patrick Ewing (born 1962), Jamaica-born American basketball player and coach
 Patrick Ewing Jr. (born 1984), son of Patrick, American basketball player representing Jamaica internationally
 Reid Ewing (born 1988), American actor
 Skip Ewing (born 1964), American country music singer and songwriter
 Wenika Ewing (born 1985), Turks and Caicos fashion model

Fictional characters

Dallas and Knots Landing
The surname was used for the central Ewing family in the American primetime soap operas Dallas, as well as its 2012 revival and its spin-off Knots Landing. Listed below are characters who used that surname from all three series'.
 Abby Ewing
 Amanda Lewis Ewing
 Ann Ewing
 April Stevens Ewing
 Betsy Ewing
 Bobby Ewing
 Bobby Ewing II
 Cally Harper Ewing
 Christopher Ewing
 (Miss) Ellie Ewing Farlow
 Gary Ewing
 Jack Ewing
 Jamie Ewing Barnes
 Jock Ewing
 John Ross Ewing III
 J.R. Ewing
 Lucy Ewing
 Pamela Barnes Ewing
 Pamela Rebecca Ewing
 Sue Ellen Ewing
 Valene Ewing

See also
 Clan Ewing
 Ewing (disambiguation)
 Orr-Ewing Baronets
 Adlai Ewing Stevenson I
 Adlai Ewing Stevenson II
 Adlai Ewing Stevenson III
 William Euing, whose surname was occasionally spelled Ewing

References

 Oxford Dictionary of English Surnames (page 158, by P. H. Reaney, revised by R. M. Wilson, Third Edition, Oxford University Press, 2005)

External links
 Ewing Family Association
 Ewing Surname Y-DNA Project

Surnames of Scottish origin